Robert Whittingham (1888 – 9 June 1926) was an English footballer who played as an inside-forward for various clubs, mainly prior to the First World War. He played in the Football League for Stoke, Blackpool, Bradford City, and Chelsea. He helped Chelsea to win promotion out of the Second Division in 1911–12. He was the younger brother of fellow footballer Sam Whittingham.

Career
A powerfully-built and prolific goalscoring inside-forward, Whittingham started out with amateur side Goldenhill Wanderers, before signing for Stoke (without making a first team appearance) and later Crewe Alexandra.

He later moved on to Blackpool, where he stayed for just a year. He scored 28 goals in 53 league games, becoming the club's top goalscorer over two terms (he achieved the feat in the latter season despite his leaving Bloomfield Road midway through the campaign). In January 1909, he joined First Division side Bradford City and scored 11 goals in nine games to save the "Bantams" from relegation at the expense of Manchester City. He then equalled a then-club-record 21 league goals during the 1909–10 season. His performances at Valley Parade earned him a move to David Calderhead's relegation threatened Chelsea in April 1910 – for a fee of £1,300.

Whittingham arrived too late to save the club from relegation into the Second Division, but he scored prolifically during the next two seasons, hitting 30 goals in his first full season with Chelsea, though they narrowly missed out on promotion, finishing third. His 26 goals in 1911–12, almost half of the club's season total, played a big part in their winning promotion back to the First Division. He scored 12 goals in 1912–13 to become the club's top-scorer for a third consecutive season. He left Stamford Bridge in 1913 and had a stint with South Shields before the First World War broke out.

During the war he guested for Stoke, where he became a prolific scorer hitting 26 in 1915–16, 22 in 1916–17, 15 in 1917–18 and 23 in 1918–19. He also guested for Fulham and Port Vale. He made an appearance for the Football League XI in February 1919 against the Scottish League at St Andrew's, Birmingham, in the first representative match played after the First World War, and scored the second goal in a 3–1 win; according to the Daily Express reporter, "the pick" of the English XI were Whittingham, Billy Morgan, and Joe Clennell. He returned to Chelsea after the war, playing six more games in the 1919–20 season, finishing his time with the club with a record of 80 goals from 129 league and FA Cup games. He then moved to Stoke again for a £500 fee, where he scored eight goals in 18 Second Division games in another brief spell at the Victoria Ground. His goal tally included one against rivals Port Vale in a 3–0 win at The Old Recreation Ground. However, he struggled with an ankle injury and ill health forced his retirement in April 1920. He was given a benefit match by Stoke in October 1920.

Whittingham joined Cheshire County League side Macclesfield at the start of the 1921–22 season but struggled with his fitness and moved on to Scunthorpe United in February 1922. He later played for Wrexham before returning to Goldenhill Wanderers. Despite his prolific goalscoring record, Whittingham was never capped for England, though he did feature in a Victory international against Wales at the Victoria Ground on 18 October 1919.

Style of play
He specialised in sending in powerful long range efforts from outside the penalty area.

Career statistics
Source:

Honours
Chelsea
 Football League Second Division second-place promotion: 1911–12

References
Specific

General
 

1888 births
1926 deaths
Footballers from Stoke-on-Trent
English footballers
England wartime international footballers
Association football forwards
Stoke City F.C. players
Crewe Alexandra F.C. players
Blackpool F.C. players
Bradford City A.F.C. players
Chelsea F.C. players
Stoke City F.C. wartime guest players
Fulham F.C. wartime guest players
Port Vale F.C. wartime guest players
Macclesfield Town F.C. players
Scunthorpe United F.C. players
Wrexham A.F.C. players
South Shields F.C. (1889) players
English Football League players
English Football League representative players